Zabrčani is a village in the municipality of Dolneni, North Macedonia.  

Cities, towns and places in Dolneni near Zabrčani include Malo Mramorani, Dupjačani, Senokos and Gorno Selo.  The closest major cities include Skopje (in North Macedonia), Pristina (in Kosovo), Tirana (in Albania) and Thessaloniki (in Greece).

Demographics
According to the 2021 census, the village had a total of 50 inhabitants. Ethnic groups in the village include:

Macedonians 49
Persons for whom data are taken from administrative sources 1

References

Villages in Dolneni Municipality